The Southwark School's Learning Partnership is a collaboration of ten schools — seven state and three independent — based in Southwark, a borough of south London, England. The partnership was founded in 2003.

The aims of the partnership
For staff and pupils from schools in both sectors to work together to develop innovative practice and to share and broaden their experience in order to improve teaching and learning in the participating schools
To produce research that usefully informs the debate about factors that improve achievement levels for pupils from different backgrounds in inner-city schools
To increase levels of learning and understanding for staff and pupils throughout the partner schools of what we have in common, what is different, and how we can learn from one another
To increase understanding of factors that affect pupil achievement, especially those that lead to pupils’ success, through joint inquiries
To share teachers’ passion and creativity, particularly related to subject knowledge
To break down barriers and increase understanding between the maintained and independent sectors
To publish research results to increase the wider understanding of factors that influence pupil achievement

The co-directors
The co-directors are Marion Gibbs (of JAGS) and Irene Bishop (of SSSO).
In June 2012, both were appointed CBE in the Queen's birthday honours for Services to Education, including the SSLP.
Update: As of 2016, Grainne Grabowski and Joseph Spence are the current co-directors of SSLP.

Member schools in 2012/2013
 Alleyn's School (Independent)
 Dulwich College (Independent)
 James Allen's Girls' School (Independent)
 St Michael's Catholic College
 Kingsdale School
 St. Thomas the Apostle Catholic College
 St Michael & All Angels Academy
 St Saviour's and St Olave's Church of England School
 The Charter School
 Walworth Academy

External links
 

Organizations established in 2003
Educational organisations based in London
Schools in the London Borough of Southwark
Dulwich